George William Taft (born 29 July 1993) is an English professional footballer who plays as a centre back or left back for  club Scunthorpe United.

A graduate of Leicester City's youth academy, Taft failed to break into the first team and was loaned out to Kettering Town, Karlstad BK and York City. In 2014, he joined League Two club Burton Albion on a two-year contract. Taft was capped by England at under-18 and under-19 level, and was a member of the squad for the 2011 FIFA U-20 World Cup.

Club career

Leicester City

Born in Leicester, Leicestershire, Taft started his career at Leicester City in their youth academy. He signed a professional contract with Leicester on 17 March 2011, tying him to the club until June 2013. To gain first-team experience, Taft was loaned out to Conference Premier club Kettering Town in August 2011 and after playing seven times had his loan spell extended by a month. He returned to Leicester in October 2011 having completed the loan with 14 appearances for Kettering. His first involvement with the Leicester first team was as an unused substitute against Nottingham Forest in an FA Cup third round tie which ended 0–0 on 7 January 2012. In the replay he was also an unused substitute, when Leicester won 4–0.

Taft went on loan to Swedish club Karlstad BK in Division 1 Södra in March 2012. He made 12 appearances, returning to Leicester in July 2012. At the end of the 2012–13 season, Taft signed a one-year contract extension with Leicester. On 29 August 2013, Taft joined League Two club York City on a one-month loan, and made his debut two days later in the a 2–1 away defeat to Exeter City. Having made three appearances for York, he was sent back to Leicester on 23 September 2013 after falling behind David McGurk, Daniel Parslow and Chris Smith in the pecking order for a central defensive berth. Taft was released by Leicester on 9 May 2014, following the club's promotion to the Premier League for 2014–15.

Burton Albion
Taft signed for League Two club Burton Albion on 30 May 2014 on a two-year contract. He made his debut for the club in a 1–0 away win over Oxford United. From that on in the first half of the season, Taft played regularly until he tore his hamstring during a 4–3 defeat to Carlisle United, which kept him out for six to eight weeks. Taft made his return on 17 November 2014, where he came on as a substitute for Stuart Beavon in the last minutes, in a 3–1 win over Wycombe Wanderers. Coincidentally, it was also Jimmy Floyd Hasselbaink's first match in charge.

On 3 January 2015, Taft scored the first goal of his professional career with a half volley from 12 yards in Burton's 1–0 home victory against promotion rivals Shrewsbury Town. Burton manager Hasselbaink praised Taft saying "George took his goal very well." He dedicated his goal to Richard Mayne, a victim who lost his life in Malaysia Airlines Flight 17. Taft helped the club earn promotion to League One for the first time in its history. In the 2014–15 season, Taft made 34 appearances for Burton and scored once. At the club's award ceremony, Taft was named the club's player in the community.

On 31 July 2015, Taft joined League Two club Cambridge United on a six-month loan. He returned to Burton on 29 October 2015 after tearing his anterior cruciate ligament in a league match against Yeovil Town.

Mansfield Town and Cambridge United
Taft signed for League Two club Mansfield Town on 26 May 2016 on a free transfer. On 31 August 2017, he returned to Cambridge United on loan until January 2018. Taft rejoined Cambridge on 29 January 2018 on loan for the rest of the 2017–18 season, following an injury to Leon Legge. He was released by Mansfield at the end of 2017–18.

Taft signed for League Two club Cambridge United permanently on 30 May 2018 on a two-year contract.

Bolton Wanderers

On 20 July 2020, Taft joined Bolton Wanderers on a two-year deal. His debut came on 5 September in Bolton's first match of the season, a 1–2 home defeat against Bradford in the first round of the EFL Cup.

Scunthorpe United (loan)
On 6 January 2021, Taft joined League Two side Scunthorpe United on loan for the remainder of the 2020/21 season.

Scunthorpe United
On 31 January, Taft joined Scunthorpe on a permanent basis.

International career
At international level, Taft represented England at under-18 level one time and scored in his only appearance against Poland on 16 November 2010. He made his debut for the under-19 team against Germany on 9 February 2011, and earned a total of five caps at this level. He was named in the under-20 squad for the 2011 FIFA U-20 World Cup but did not make any appearances.

Style of play
Though primarily a centre back, Taft can also play as a left back. After signing for Burton Albion, manager Gary Rowett praised him for his height. After being promoted from the junior to the senior team of Leicester City, manager Sven-Göran Eriksson said "This is great news. They are very talented young footballers and we have the belief that they will progress." During his loan spell with Kettering Town, he was both played as a centre back and a left back.

Career statistics

Honours
Burton Albion
Football League Two: 2014–15

References

External links

Profile at the Cambridge United F.C. website

1993 births
Living people
Footballers from Leicester
English footballers
England youth international footballers
Association football defenders
Leicester City F.C. players
Kettering Town F.C. players
Karlstad BK players
York City F.C. players
Burton Albion F.C. players
Cambridge United F.C. players
Mansfield Town F.C. players
Bolton Wanderers F.C. players
Scunthorpe United F.C. players
National League (English football) players
Ettan Fotboll players
English Football League players
English expatriate footballers
Expatriate footballers in Sweden
English expatriate sportspeople in Sweden